Ellen Svinhufvud ( Timgren; 23 December 1869 — 24 August 1953) was the wife of Finland's third president, Pehr Evind Svinhufvud, serving as the First Lady of Finland from 1931 until 1937.

She married Pehr Evind Svinhufvud in 1889, and the couple had six children.

She was active in the women's paramilitary Lotta Svärd organisation, as well as in the Martha organisation.

Her personal interests included various handicrafts, and she even had a loom installed in the Presidential Palace. She was also a keen gardener, and skilled at looking after the family manor house and farm in Luumäki.

References

First ladies and gentlemen of Finland
People from Turku
1869 births
1953 deaths